I Love Trouble is a 1994 American romantic comedy/crime film starring Julia Roberts and Nick Nolte. It was written and produced by the husband-and-wife team of Nancy Meyers and Charles Shyer, and directed by Shyer.

Plot 
Peter Brackett and Sabrina Peterson are two rival Chicago newspaper reporters. Sabrina is young and ambitious, whereas Peter is a fading star and has just published his first novel. They reluctantly join forces to unravel the mystery behind a train derailment. They argue over almost everything but discover a conspiracy involving genetically altered milk.

Cast
 Julia Roberts - Sabrina Peterson
 Nick Nolte - Peter Brackett
 Saul Rubinek - Sam Smotherman/Ernesto Vargas
 James Rebhorn - the Thin Man
 Robert Loggia - Matt Greenfield, Chronicle Editor
 Kelly Rutherford - Kim
 Olympia Dukakis - Jeannie, Peter's Secretary
 Marsha Mason - Senator Gayle Robbins
 Eugene Levy - Justice of the Peace
 Charles Martin Smith - Rick Medwick
 Dan Butler - Wilson Chess
 Paul Gleason - Kenny Bacon
 Jane Adams - Evans
 Lisa Lu - Virginia Harvey
 Nora Dunn - Lindy
 Megan Cavanagh - Mrs. Delores Beekman
 Clark Gregg - Darryl Beekman, Jr.
 Anna Holbrook - Woman in Sportscar
 Jay Wolpert - Passing Writer
 Andy Milder - Copy Man
 Dorothy Lyman - Suzie
 Keith Gordon - Andy
 Joseph D'Onofrio - Sully
 Barry Sobel - Delivery Person
 Frankie Faison - Police Chief
 Stuart Pankin - Society Photographer
 James 'Kimo' Wills - Danny Brown
 Patrick St. Esprit - Assassin
 Paul Hirsch - Man on Plane
 Jessica Lundy - Flight Attendant #1
 Nestor Serrano - Pecos
 Robin Duke - Sandra
 Bruce A. Block - Man at Newsstand
 Hallie Meyers-Shyer - Little Girl in Barn

Production
In February 1993 it was announced Nolte had been cast as one of the leads. 
Nolte and Roberts notoriously did not get along with each other during the making of the film. Roberts has described him as "disgusting," whereas Nolte has said she's "not a nice person."

Reception

The film grossed over $30 million in box-office receipts in the United States and less than $62 million worldwide.

On Rotten Tomatoes the film has an approval rating of 22% rating based on 46 reviews. The site's consensus states: "There appears to be no Love lost between the fatally mismatched coupling of Julia Roberts and Nick Nolte in this screwball misfire that just isn't worth the Trouble." Audiences surveyed by CinemaScore gave the film a grade B on scale of A to F.

Todd McCarthy of Variety  wrote: "The goings-on seem lacking in wit and inspiration, tolerably entertaining but far from effervescent." Roger Ebert of the Chicago Sun-Times wrote: "Maybe it would have been funnier if the evil cow conglomerate had been replaced by something sillier and more lightweight; it's hard to sustain a romantic comedy in the face of death threats."

According to Nolte, it is the worst film in which he has ever appeared. He felt he sold his soul by doing it, and he did it only for the money. As a result, he was tense while on the set, and did not have a good working relationship with Julia Roberts.
Roberts has, on her part, called Nolte the worst actor with whom she has ever worked.

Year-end lists 
 Sixth worst – Peter Travers, Rolling Stone
 Top 12 worst (Alphabetically ordered, not ranked) – David Elliott, The San Diego Union-Tribune
Dishonorable mention – Glenn Lovell, San Jose Mercury News
 Dishonorable mention – Dan Craft, The Pantagraph

Music
Elmer Bernstein originally wrote the underscore, but his music was thrown out, and David Newman was called in at such a late stage that posters with Bernstein's name on the credits were already displayed. With only two weeks to rescore the film, Newman - who usually orchestrates the bulk of his scores himself - used a small army of orchestrators to help him complete the score: Scott Smalley, Chris Boardman, William Kidd, Peter Tomashek, Steven Bramson, Christopher Klatman, Don Davis, Joel Rosenbaum, Arthur Kempel (misspelt "Kempl" in the end credits), Mark McKenzie, Brad Warnaar (misspelt "Warner" in the end credits), and John Neufeld. The soundtrack album was released by Varèse Sarabande, including a cover version of the Smokey Robinson song "You've Really Got a Hold on Me"; only Smalley and Boardman received orchestrator credit on the album (but Ross received an acknowledgement - as does Alan Silvestri, who was also attached to the project).

 Here's Peter (5:09)
 Here's Sabrina (1:54)
 Calling All Boggs (1:15)
 Honeymoon Night (4:55)
 Two Scoop Snoops (3:39)
 Everybody Buys the Globe (:46)
 Scoop de Jour (3:15)
 Sabrina's Hip (1:04)
 Wild Goose Chase (1:16)
 The Beekman Agreement (2:02)
 Keyhole Foreplay (1:20)
 Happily Ever After (2:21)
 "I Love Trouble" (3:43)
 You've Really Got a Hold On Me - Robbyn Kirmsse (3:37)

References

External links

 
 
 

1994 films
Films directed by Charles Shyer
Films with screenplays by Charles Shyer
1994 romantic comedy films
Films set in Chicago
Films shot in Chicago
Films shot in Wisconsin
American romantic comedy films
Touchstone Pictures films
Caravan Pictures films
Films about journalists
Films with screenplays by Nancy Meyers
Films scored by David Newman
1990s English-language films
1990s American films